Heavy Metal Thunder is the 9th studio album by the Japanese heavy metal band The Sex Machineguns. It was released on March 2, 2005 in Japan only. The title track was the theme song to the PS2 video game by the same name, which the band had a key supporting role in.

Track listing 
Heavy Metal Thunder
伝説のキャッチボールDensetsu no Kyacchibōru/Legendary Catchball
焼き肉パーティーYakiniku Pātī/Yakiniku Party
ブラジルカーニバルBurajiru Kānibaru/Brazil Carnival
サスペンス劇場Sasupensu Gekijô/Suspense Theater
パンダちゃんPanda-Chan
踏み台昇降運動Fumidai Shôko Undô
フランケンシュタインFurankenshutain/Frankenstein
出前道一直線Demaedo Icchokusen
ダンシング課長Danshingu Kachô/Dancing Kachô
4

2005 albums
Sex Machineguns albums